Italia Oggi is an Italian political, financial, legal and fiscal daily newspaper, started in 1991. The paper is owned by the financial publishing company Class Editori. The paper was formerly part of the Ferruzzi Group. Italia Oggi Editore is the publisher of the paper, which has its headquarters in Milan.

The paper launched its daily supplement, Marketing Oggi, in 1997.

The circulation of Italia Oggi was 86,934 copies in 2008. The paper had a circulation of 86,892 copies in 2009 and 89,088 copies in 2010.

References

Official website
 http://www.italiaoggi.it/ 

1991 establishments in Italy
Business newspapers published in Italy
Class Editori
Italian-language newspapers
Legal newspapers
Newspapers published in Milan
Publications established in 1991
Daily newspapers published in Italy